Conus thomae, common name St. Thomas cone, is a species of sea snail, a marine gastropod mollusk in the family Conidae, the cone snails and their allies.

Like all species within the genus Conus, these snails are predatory and venomous. They are noted for their potent stings, making the Conus thomae potentially dangerous to humans.

Description
The size of the shell varies between 55 mm and 97 mm. The narrow shell is whitish, encircled by numerous hues of square spots and dashes of orange-brown, often forming two or three broad bands by their approximation.

Distribution
This marine species occurs in the Indian Ocean and off the Moluccas and the Philippines.

References

 Filmer R.M. (2001). A Catalogue of Nomenclature and Taxonomy in the Living Conidae 1758–1998. Backhuys Publishers, Leiden. 388pp.
 Tucker J.K. & Tenorio M.J. (2009) Systematic classification of Recent and fossil conoidean gastropods. Hackenheim: Conchbooks. 296 pp.

External links
 The Conus Biodiversity website
 Cone Shells – Knights of the Sea
 

thomae
Gastropods described in 1791